Strike Force: Shantipole is a 1988 role-playing game adventure for Star Wars: The Roleplaying Game published by West End Games.

Plot summary
Strike Force: Shantipole is an adventure in which a group of rebels led by Commander Ackbar have to escort prototype B-Wing fighters to Alliance High Command before the Empire captures or destroys the project.

Publication history
Strike Force: Shantipole was written by Ken Rolston and Steve Gilbert, and was published by West End Games in 1988 as a 32-page book, with a large color map.

Reception
James Wallis reviewed Strike Force: Shantipole for Games International magazine, and gave it 3 1/2 stars out of 5, and stated that "Strike Force: Shantipole runs well as a Star Wars adventure, but it lacks depth and, apart from the new alien race and the upgraded B-Wings it contains little of any great consequence, not even an interesting NPC. All in all, it is a useful package for those who don't want to write their own material for Star Wars but by no means an essential buy."

Reviews
Challenge #37 (1989)
Dragon #155 (March, 1990)

References

External links

Role-playing game supplements introduced in 1988
Star Wars: The Roleplaying Game adventures